The Instituto Municipal de Ensino Superior de Assis (IMESA) (or in English Assis's Municipal Institute of Higher Education) is a city university in the city of Assis in Brazil. It is governed by the Fundação Educacional do Município de Assis and was founded in 1985 and is controlled by Prefeitura Municipal de Assis. IMESA have 15 undergraduate and 4 postgraduate courses. 

The president of IMESA is Teacher Master Eduardo Augusto Vella Gonçalves and from FEMA is Teacher Doctor Ulysses Telles Guariba Netto

About
FEMA was created in 1985 and the first course of IMESA began in 1988. FEMA was created to satisfy the interest of Paranapanema Valley politicians. In Assis (in this time) that don't had others universities except for UNESP (or in this time, the Institute of Letters, History and Psychology) and Assis's Educational Institute. The firsts undergraduates courses was Mathematical and Data Processing. Today IMESA have 14 courses of undergraduate and 4 courses of postgraduate. It's the second largest university of Assis and the third largest university at Paranapanema Valley.

Courses

References

Educational institutions established in 1985
Assis
1985 establishments in Brazil
Universities and colleges in São Paulo (state)
State universities and colleges in Brazil